Epitolina is a genus of butterflies in the family Lycaenidae. Confusingly, it is also the name of a subtribe within the subfamily Poritiinae and the tribe Liptenini. Epitolina is endemic to the Afrotropical realm.

Species
Epitolina dispar group
Epitolina collinsi Libert, 2000
Epitolina dispar (Kirby, 1887)
Epitolina melissa (Druce, 1888)
Epitolina catori group
Epitolina catori Bethune-Baker, 1904
Epitolina larseni Libert, 2000

References

Poritiinae
Lycaenidae genera
Taxa named by Per Olof Christopher Aurivillius